Thomas Butler, 3rd Baron Cahir or Caher (died ) was an Anglo-Irish peer. He was the son of Piers Butler, the nephew of his namesake the 2nd Baron and the grandson of the 1st Baron.

Marriage and issue
He married Eleanor, the sister of John Power, 5th Baron Le Power. His heir, Edmund, predeceased the Baron who was succeeded by his grandson, Pierce.

References

17th-century Irish people
Year of birth uncertain
Barons in the Peerage of Ireland
Thomas
1648 deaths